The rufous-tailed shama (Copsychus pyrropygus) is a species of passerine bird in the Old World flycatcher family Muscicapidae. It is found in extreme southern Thailand, Malaysia, Sumatra, and Borneo, where its natural habitats are subtropical or tropical moist lowland forests and subtropical or tropical swamps. It is threatened by habitat loss.

This species was formerly placed in the monotypic genus Trichixos but was moved to Copsychus based on the results of a molecular phylogenetic study published in 2010.

References

rufous-tailed shama
Birds of Malesia
rufous-tailed shama
Taxonomy articles created by Polbot
Taxobox binomials not recognized by IUCN